Kensington railway station is located on the Craigieburn line in Victoria, Australia. It serves the northern Melbourne suburb of Kensington, and it opened on 1 November 1860.

History

Kensington station opened on 1 November 1860, just over a week after the railway line to Essendon opened as part of the private Melbourne and Essendon Railway Company. The station closed with the line on 1 July 1864, but was reopened on 9 October 1871, under government ownership. Like the suburb itself, the station was named after Kensington, in central London.

In 1886, the station building on Platform 1 was constructed, as was the signal box. In 1965, the interlocked gates at the Macaulay Road level crossing were replaced by boom barriers. The signal box is located at the Up end of the station, just past the level crossing. A siding is also located at the Up end, used for the nearby grain silos.

On 5 November 1986, a collision between a Broadmeadows-bound Comeng train and locomotive H4 occurred near the station. Also in that year, a number of goods lines to the south of the station were booked out of use. The overhead wires for these lines was also removed around this time.

Special services to Flemington Racecourse and Showgrounds stations pass through the station, but do not stop, with signs on Platform 2 advising passengers of this.

Platforms and services

Kensington has two side platforms. It is serviced by Metro Trains' Craigieburn line services.

Platform 1:
  all stations services to Flinders Street

Platform 2:
  all stations services to Craigieburn

Transport links

Transit Systems Victoria operates one route via Kensington station, under contract to Public Transport Victoria:
 : Footscray station – East Melbourne

Gallery

References

External links
 
 Melway map at street-directory.com.au

Rail freight terminals in Victoria (Australia)
Railway stations in Melbourne
Railway stations in Australia opened in 1860
Railway stations in the City of Melbourne (LGA)